Decisive Engagement: The Liaoxi-Shenyang Campaign is a 1991 Chinese epic war film directed by Li Jun, Yang Guangyuan, Wei Lian, Cai Jiwei, Zhao Jilie, Zhai Junjie and Jing Mukui, written by Li Pingfen, Shi Chao and Wang Jun, and starring Gu Yue, Su Lin, Ma Shaoxin, Lu Jixian, Zhao Hengduo, and Wu Zhiyuan. The film premiered in China on January 1, 1992.  The film is about the Liaoshen Campaign of the Chinese Civil War.

Plot
In the spring of 1948, during the Chinese Civil War, the Central Military Commission commands the Fourth Field Army control Jinzhou, a communication hub in northeast China and even a vital importance of military strategists. The Liaoshen Campaign broke out, the People's Liberation Army fight against the Nationalist forces in northeastern China, then the land was occupied by the Communists.

Cast

Main
 Gu Yue as Mao Zedong
 Su Lin as Zhou Enlai
 Ma Shaoxin as Lin Biao
 Lu Jixian as Luo Ronghuan
 Zhao Hengduo as Chiang Kai-shek
 Wu Zhiyuan as Soong May-ling

Supporting

Chinese Communist Party characters
 Guo Fazeng as Liu Shaoqi
 Liu Huaizheng as Zhu De
 Zong Liqun as Peng Dehuai
 Lu Qi as Deng Xiaoping
 Zhang Weiguo as Liu Yalou
 Gao Huibin as Tan Zheng
 Yao Jude as Su Jing
 Lu Xi as Ren Bishi
 Zhang Yonghan as He Long
 Zhao Xiaoming as Xu Xiangqian
 Qiao Hong as Ye Jianying
 Feng Enhe as Duan Suquan
 Wu Honghou as Han Xianchu
 Chen Gang as Li Xiannian
 Gao Qiang as Battalion commander Gao
 Zhang Yongxiang as Company commander Zhang
 Chen Xiaolei as a soldier.

Kuomintang characters
 Yang Ciyu as Li Zongren
 Lu Xuegong as Wei Lihuang
 Xu Zhengyun as Du Yuming
 Yan Yusheng as Fan Hanjie
 Shi Jing as Zheng Dongguo
 Zhou Zhiyu as Liao Yaoxiang
 Chen Xuegang as He Yingqin
 Qin Zhao as Chiang Ching-kuo
 Xie Gang as Chiang Wei-kuo
 Lu Fei as Gu Zhutong
 Ma Dalong as Zhao Jiaxiang
 Song Chunli as Han Quanhua, wife of Wei Lihuang.
 Cui Kefa as Yu Jishi
 Qu Yuan as Chen Bulei
 Huang Gang as Liao Yaoxiang
 Zhao Xiaochuan as Zheng Dongguo	
 Sun Haiying as a lieutenant commander

Production

Development
In 1950s, the August First Film Studio was planning films about the three major campaigns: Liaoshen Campaign, Huaihai Campaign and Pingjin Campaign. But because of the limits of conditions, the project had been put on hold. In January 1986, the then General Secretary of the Communist Party of China Hu Yaobang ordered the relevant organizations to turn the three major campaigns into a feature. The Central Military Commission began to negotiate with the August First Film Studio to produce a film. In February 1986, Li Pingfen, Shi Chao and Wang Jun signed on to write the script for the film. They consulted a lot of data, including the memoirs of veterans, interviewed more than 300 campaign participants, and also surveyed the old battlefields. The then vice-chairman of Central Military Commission Yang Shangkun and the then director of the General Political Department Yang Baibing had repeatedly summoned the producers to discuss the film. At the end of 1987, the film finally finished writing. Li Jun was signed to direct the film and Yang Qingwei served as general producer. At the end of 1989, the directors visited Nie Rongzhen, a commander in the Pingjin Campaign. The title of the film was written by Jiang Zemin, General Secretary of the Communist Party of China. After seeing the film, Deng Xiaoping said, "The film is very good. I watch it every year."

Filming
Gu Yue, Lu Qi and Ma Shaoxin were cast in respective lead roles of Mao Zedong, Deng Xiaoping and Lin Biao for the film. Zhao Hengduo was selected to cast as Chiang Kai-shek and Su Lin was selected to cast as Zhou Enlai.

Filming
Filming took place in Heilongjiang, Zhejiang, Ningxia, Shandong. Nearly 800 of the 1000 workers in the August First Film Studio participated in the shooting. PLA soldiers from Shenyang Military Region, Beijing Military Region, Jinan Military Region, Nanjing Military Region and Lanzhou Military Region participated in the film.  The scenes of Mao Zedong labours up the hillside and the Yellow River of ice is thawing were filmed in north Shaanxi. The camera crew worked hard in the Yellow River for two years to get the scenes.

Release
Decisive Engagement: The Liaoxi-Shenyang Campaign premiered in the Great Hall of the People on August 1, 1991, with wide-release in China on January 1, 1992.

Accolades

References

External links

 
 

1992 films
Chinese historical films
Chinese war films
Chinese epic films
Films set in Shaanxi
Films set in Shenyang
Films set in Liaoning
Films set in Jilin
Films set in Heilongjiang
Films shot in Liaoning
Films shot in Jilin
Films shot in Heilongjiang
Films shot in Shandong
Films shot in Zhejiang
Films shot in Shaanxi
Cultural depictions of Mao Zedong
Cultural depictions of Zhou Enlai
Cultural depictions of Deng Xiaoping
Cultural depictions of Chiang Kai-shek